The sublingual fovea (or sublingual fossa) is a fovea in the mandible for the sublingual gland.

References

Additional Images

External links
 http://www.dartmouth.edu/~humananatomy/part_8/chapter_42.html
 http://www.dartmouth.edu/~humananatomy/figures/chapter_42/42-21.HTM
 http://zemlin.shs.uiuc.edu/Skull/slide-Pages/15.htm

Bones of the head and neck